Modena Football Club 2018, commonly referred to as Modena, is an Italian football club based in Modena, Emilia-Romagna. The club was founded in 1912, and refounded in 2018, and had spent the majority of its existence playing in Serie B. They are set to play to Serie B in 2022–23, after having won 2021–22 Serie C's Group B title.

History

Foundation and early years
Modena Football Club was formed in on 5 April 1912 as the result of a merging between existing Modenese clubs, Football Club Audax Modena and l' Associazione Studentesca del Calcio Modena.  The new colours were to be yellow and blue. Modena's first friendly match was played on 3 November 1912 in the Piazza d'Armi against Venezia.

Modena first took part Italian football league in 1912–13, where they competed in the top division. These early years saw the purchase of Attilio Fresia, perhaps the greatest player in the club's history. During the period of the first world war, the team won the 1916 Coppa Federale.

In 1920–21, Modena lost 4–0 in the championship semi-finals to Alessandria. In the years following, there was a period of disorganization in Italian football and Modena found itself at odds with the Italian Football Federation (FIGC) and moved to the CI Comitato Calcistico Italiano along with Internazionale, Venezia, Torino, Genoa and others. In 1929–30, their first in Serie A (then a single round consisting of 18 teams), the club finished in 12th place with 30 points.

In 1931–32 came the club's first relegation to Serie B, where they remained until 1937. The 1936–37 season featured the inauguration of Modena's new stadium, dedicated to Cesare Marzari, a former gialloblu played killed in the war in Africa. During these years, the name was changed to Modena Calcio following directives of the regime aimed at eliminating all foreign words in the sports lexicon. In the 1937–38 season, there was a return to Serie A led by the Hungarian player/coach János Nehadoma. The following season, Modena escaped relegation by just one point. The 1939–40 campaign was the year when the numbers first appeared on the shirts of players, but at the end of the season, the yellow and blue were relegated to Serie B.

1940s, 50s and 60s
In 1940–41, Modena returned to Serie A despite World War II considerably reducing the workforce. The following year, they fell back to Serie B. At the end of the war, however, Modena finished third in Serie A, just behind Torino and Juventus. Following the resignation of both the president and coach in 1948–49, however, the squad was relegated back to Serie B.

The club remained in Serie B throughout the 1950s. Tenor Luciano Pavarotti played on the team, making several appearances as a winger. In 1957–58, Zenit became the sponsor of the team, providing 100 million lira for promotion to Serie A, but the team finished only in seventh place. In 1959–60, the sponsor withdrew and the team was relegated to Serie C for the first time.

The 1960s began with Modena in Serie C. In 1960–61, under coach Malagoli, the team was promoted to Serie B, and the next year found Modena back in the top flight due in large part to the efforts of striker Enrico Pagliari (26 goals in 2 seasons). The following year, thanks mainly to the Brazilian Chinesinho, Modena achieved safety in Serie A, but in 1963–64, despite the return of Sergio Brighenti, Modena fell back to Serie B after a playoff defeat to Sampdoria played in Milan. For the remainder of the 1960s, the club played in Serie B.

1970s, 80s and 90s
In 1971–72, after changing three coaches, Modena again fell down to Serie C. Following consecutive seventh-place finishes in Serie C, Modena finally was promoted back to Serie B in 1974–75. In 1976–77, Modena achieved safety in Serie B only by beating Monza on the last day of the season. 1977–78 saw a corporate crisis in which the club was relegated to Serie C. In the following season, it was relegated even further down to Serie C2, its lowest point since the club was founded.

The beginning of the 1980s saw Modena back to Serie C1 and out of its economic crisis. Modena even won the Anglo-Italian Cup in 1981 and 1982. In 1985–86, they returned to Serie B behind the 21 goals scored by Sauro Frutti. In the following season, the club was dramatically saved from relegation on the final day, beating local rivals Bologna in the derby. But in 1987–88, Modena were again relegated to Serie C1.

The 1989–90 season saw Modena promoted back to Serie B, led by their manager Renzo Ulivieri and goalkeeper Marco Ballotta who allowed a record low 9 goals conceded in 34 games. In 1991–92, following the departure of Ulivieri for Vicenza, Modena was again saved from relegation on the final day, beating Messina 2–1. The rest of the decade saw the club in tumultuous financial and sporting position, as in 1993–94 the team was relegated to C1. A year later, Modena was surprisingly relegated to C2 after losing a play-out with Massese, however the club was rescued by the FIGC due to another team's penalty, ensuring Modena's status in C1. The following year, only a loss to Lumezzane in the play-offs denied the club's promotion.

2000s to 2017 and beyond
In 2000–01, despite the death of the chairman Luigi Montagnani in the summer, the team begins a cycle of two great years: first promoted from Serie C1 to Serie B and the following year the club returned to Serie A for the first time in 38 years. Modena begin their stint back in the top flight with a humbling 0–3 defeat at the hand of Milan, but followed it up with a historic 2–1 victory against Roma at the Stadio Olimpico. The rest of the season was difficult, however, Modena secured its Serie A status on the last day of the season. The following season saw the club finish third from bottom on 30 points to be sent back to Serie B where they remained until their relegation to the third division at the end of the 2015-16 season.

On 5 November 2017, Modena was declared bankrupt after failing to pay player wages or stadium bills, which brought about a player strike and a stadium lockout. The club had not attended the previous three Serie C matches, including the match against Santarcangelo Calcio; with a total of four matches not attended, the club were officially excluded from "Lega Pro" on 6 November.

Following that, Modena Mayor Gian Carlo Muzzarelli issued a public manifestation of interest to entrepreneurs interested in reviving football in Modena by forming a new club to take the vacancy left by the dissolution of the Canarini. The task fell to former club president Romano Amadei, who re-founded the club and registered it in time for the 2018–19 Serie D. Former Modena sports director Doriano Tosi returned and former manager Luigi Apolloni, who gained promotion to Serie C with Parma in 2016, was appointed manager. Former Modena player Armando Perna was the first signing of the newborn side.

Modena ended the season in first place, together with Pergolettese; this forced a one-legged playoff to be hold, which ended in a 1–2 loss for the Canarini. However, Modena were readmitted to Serie C in July 2019 to fill a league vacancy.

In 2022, Modena finally won back a spot in the Italian second division, following a successful 2021–22 Serie C season under the guidance of experienced manager Attilio Tesser which saw them winning the Group B title with a two-point margin over rivals Reggiana.

Current squad

Out on loan

Honours

League
Serie B (2): 1937–38, 1942–43
Serie C1 (5):  1960–61, 1974–1975,  1989–1990,  2000–01, 2021–22
Serie C2 (1):  1979–80

Cups
Supercoppa di Serie C (2):  2001, 2022

Other Titles
Anglo-Italian Cup (2): 1981, 1982.
Geneva International Friendship Tournament (1): 1947

Records
Player with most appearances: Renato Braglia , 484
Player with most goals: Renato Brighenti , 82
Largest home win: 6–0 v Livorno, Serie A 1929–30
Largest home loss: 5–0 v Napoli, Serie A 1929–30
Largest away win: 0–4 v Venezia, Serie A 1939–40
Largest away loss: 1–9 v Lazio, Serie A 1931–32

Divisional movements

Notable players

Notable former managers
See .

 Ferenc Kónya (1924–25)
 János Nehadoma (1936–38)
 Umberto Caligaris (1938–39)
 Paolo Todeschini (1955–56)
 Annibale Frossi (1962–64)
 Stefano Angeleri (1973)
 Umberto Pinardi (1976–78)
 Bruno Giorgi (1981–82)
 Luigi Mascalaito (1984–85)
 Renzo Ulivieri (1989–91)
 Adriano Fedele (1997–98)
 Alessandro Scanziani (1997–98)
 Paolo Stringara (1998–99)
 Gianni De Biasi (1999–03)
 Alberto Malesani (2003–04)
 Gianfranco Bellotto (2003–04)
 Stefano Pioli (2004–06)
 Daniele Zoratto (2006–07)
 Bortolo Mutti (2007–08)
 Daniele Zoratto (2008–09)
 Luigi Apolloni (2009–10)
 Cristiano Bergodi (2010–11)
 Agatino Cuttone (2011–12)
 Cristiano Bergodi (2012)
 Dario Marcolin (2012–13)
 Walter Novellino (2013–15)
 Simone Pavan (2015)
 Hernán Crespo (2015–16)
 Cristiano Bergodi (2016)
 Simone Pavan (2016)
 Ezio Capuano (2016–2017)

References

 
Football clubs in Italy
Football clubs in Emilia-Romagna
Modena
Association football clubs established in 1912
Italian football First Division clubs
Serie B clubs
1912 establishments in Italy
Phoenix clubs (association football)